Matiaria is a village in West Champaran district in the Indian state of Bihar.

Demographics
As of 2011 India census, Matiaria had a population of 2493 in 433 households. Males constitute 51.5% of the population and females 48.4%. Matiaria has an average literacy rate of 42.5%, lower than the national average of 74%: male literacy is 61.5%, and female literacy is 38.4%. In Matiaria, 20% of the population is under 6 years of age.

References

Villages in West Champaran district